Taybeh is a Christian Palestinian village in the West Bank,  northeast of Jerusalem and  northeast of Ramallah in the Ramallah and al-Bireh Governorate,  above sea level. According to the Palestinian Central Bureau of Statistics, Taybeh had a population of 1,452 in 2007.

Taybeh is one of the about a dozen majority-Christian villages in the West Bank.

Etymology
"Taybeh" means "The goodly".

In 1882, SWP suggested that Taybeh might have been ancient Ophrah. According to local tradition, Saladin met a delegation of its inhabitants during his wars against Crusaders. Impressed by the hospitality of the locals, he renamed the village Taybeh, or "goodly" in Arabic. Another version of the story is that he was charmed by their goodness and the beauty of their faces, ordering the village to be renamed Tayyibat al-Isem ("beautiful of name") instead of what sounded like Afra ("full of dust").

According to Israeli archeologist Hanan Eshel, When the Arabic language was adopted in the region of Palestine, some place-names called Ofrah were renamed Taybeh in order to avoid mentioning Ifrit, a demon in Islamic mythology.

Biblical significance

Ancient period
It has been suggested that Taybeh might have been ancient Ophrah. The town is mentioned in Josephus' The Jewish War during the time of the First Jewish-Roman War under the Greek appellation Ephraim.

According to Conder and Kitchener, Taybeh was an important place during both Jewish and Crusader times. They noted a rock-cut tomb in the village with multiple kokhim, which they thought was originally Jewish but was later reused by Christians as evidenced by the double Latin cross relief cut above the entrance.

Byzantine period 
In the 5th century, a church, known today as St George's Church, was built in the east of the town.

Crusader period
In the 12th century, another church was built by the Crusaders attached to the first one. The Crusaders fortified Taybeh by means of a castle named in English the Castle of St Elias. In February 1182, Joscelin III gave the castle to king Baldwin IV of Jerusalem along with some other properties in return for the lordship of Mi'ilya.

In 1185, the king Baldwin V of Jerusalem granted the castle to his grandfather William V, Marquess of Montferrat.

However, in 1187 Taybeh fell to Saladin in the wake of the Battle of Hattin. Imad ad-Din al-Isfahani (1125–1201) described it as a Crusader fortress taken by Saladin, while Yaqut al-Hamawi (1179–1229) described it, under the name of 'Afra, as "a fortress in the Filastin Province, near Jerusalem."

Ottoman period
In 1596, the village was named Tayyibat al-Isem as it appeared in the Ottoman tax registers, located in the Nahiya of Quds of the Liwa of Quds. It had a population of 63 Muslim households and 23 Christian families. The village paid taxes on wheat, barley, vines or fruit trees, and goats or beehives; a total of 22,100 akçe. All of the revenue went to a Waqf.

Around 1810–1820, a large battle was fought in the village between rival factions of the Kais and the Yamani. Eventually the Yamani faction, led by the sheikh of Abu Ghosh, managed to regain Taybeh from the Kais faction. When Edward Robinson visited in 1838, he found it to contain 75 taxable inhabitants, indicating a population of about 300–400 people. It was noted as a Greek Christian village in the District of Beni Salim, east of Jerusalem.

French explorer Victor Guérin visited the village in 1863, and described Thayebeh as having an estimated 800 villagers, 60 Catholics, and the rest Greek Orthodox. He further noted the remains a large building on the top of a hill. An Ottoman village list from circa 1870 showed Taybeh to be a Christian town with 87 houses and a population of 283, though the population count included only men.

In 1882, the Palestine Exploration Fund's Survey of Western Palestine described Taiyibeh as a "large Christian village in a conspicuous position, with well-built stone houses. A central tower stands on the top of the hill; on either side are olive and fig gardens in the low ground. The view is extensive on either side. A ruined church of St George exists near, and there are remains of a ruined castle in the village. The inhabitants are Greek Christians."

Charles de Foucauld (1853–1916), an explorer and French hermit, passed through Taybeh in January 1889 and returned in 1898. Inspired by his visit, he wrote "Eight Days in Aphram, retreat of 1898, from Monday after IV Lent Sunday, (March 14) through Monday, after IV Lent Sunday (21 March)."

In 1896 the population of Et-taijibe was estimated to be about 672 persons.

British Mandate
In the 1922 census of Palestine conducted by the British Mandate authorities, Al Taibeh had a population of 961: 954 Christians and 7 Muslims, where 663 were Orthodox, 249 Roman Catholic, 60 Greek Catholic (Melkite Catholic) and 2 were Anglican.

In 1927 a Greek Orthodox church was built on a Byzantine church, carefully incorporating architectural elements, like columns, lintels, capitals, two fonts, and a fragmentary mosaic pavement with a Greek inscription.

At the time of the 1931 census, Taybeh had a population of 1,125; 1,038 Christians and 87 Muslims living in 262 houses.

The population had increased in 1945 to 1,330; 1,180 Christians and 150 Muslims, while the total land area was 20,231 dunams, according to an official land and population survey. Of this 5,287 were allocated for plantations and irrigable land, 5,748 for cereals, while 80 dunams were classified as built-up areas.

Jordanian period
In the wake of the 1948 Arab–Israeli War, and after the 1949 Armistice Agreements, Taybeh came under Jordanian rule. The Jordanian census of 1961 found 1,677 inhabitants in Taybeh, of whom 1,176 were Christian.

1967 and aftermath
Since the Six-Day War in 1967, Taybeh has been under Israeli occupation.
In 1986, the Charles de Foucauld Pilgrim Center funded by the French Lieutenancy of the Knights of the Holy Sepulcher opened in the village.

After the 1995 accords, 35% of village land was classified as Area B, the remaining 65% as Area C. According to ARIJ, Israel has confiscated 393 dunam of land from Taybeh for the construction of the Israeli settlements of Rimmonim, and 22 dunams for Ofra.

In September 2005, hundreds of Muslim men from Deir Jarir torched homes in Taybeh in response to an affair between a 30-year-old Muslim woman from Deir Jarir said to have been romantically involved with a Christian man from Taybeh.

Taybeh residents called the authorities to intervene, the Israelis arrived first but they watched and did not intervene. Palestinian policemen arriving from Ramallah were held at an Israeli checkpoint for three hours, and were only allowed to pass after constant calls from the U.S. consulate in Jerusalem. Despite the incident, the neighboring towns continue to have healthy relations; residents say "the people of Taybeh and the people of Deir Jarir are one family".

On 19 April 2013, Israeli settlers attempted to take over Taybeh's monastery and its adjacent chapel.

Economy

Taybeh is the home of Taybeh Brewery, one of the few breweries in Palestine. Since 2005, an Oktoberfest celebration is held in Taybeh, aiming at promoting local Palestinian products and attracting tourism. The celebration offers beer competitions, cultural, traditional and musical performances and other attractions.

From 500 liters of beer in 1995, the company produced 600,000 liters in 2011, mainly sold in the West Bank and Israel. Before the Second Intifada, the beer was sold to upscale bars in Israel. According to David Khoury, the brewery sells 6 million liters a year, and exports its products to Japan.

In November 2014, Nadim Khoury, the co-founder of Taybeh Brewing Company has also opened a line of Taybeh wines marketed under the brand name "Nadim" (Arabic for "drinking companion") for a variety of wines, such as Merlot, Cabernet Sauvignon, and Syrah.

Educational and religious institutions

The Orthodox Patriarchal School serves over 270 students, and the Roman Catholic (Latin) School serves over 400.

The different Christian denominations worship together on Easter and Christmas. The Latin parish runs a school, a medical center, a hostel for pilgrims and youth programs.

Construction of a new kindergarten and additional classrooms for Al-Taybeh Greek Orthodox School was completed in 2012 with USAID funding of $750,000. The school, built 130 years ago, is the largest in Taybeh. It is attended by 430 students from Taybeh and villages in the vicinity.

Landmarks

The Al-Khidr Church, or St George's Church, is located east of the centre of Taybeh, and was constructed during two periods, first in the Byzantine era, and then during the Crusader era.

The remains of a Crusader castle, named Castle of St. Elias or Castrum Sancti Helie in Latin, can still be seen.

Local government
The former mayor of Taybeh is David Khoury, co-owner of the local brewery established by his brother.

Demographics
Taybeh is a Christian village, with the Roman Catholic, Eastern Orthodox and Melkite Eastern Catholic faiths represented.

In 2008, Taybeh had a low birthrate and residents feared that the population would entirely disappear. According to the mayor, the population in 2010 was 2,300, with 12,000 former residents and their descendants living in the U.S., Chile, and Guatemala.

References

Bibliography

 (p.280, p.293, p.295–p.298 )

 (pp. 120–121)

 (II p. 587)

 (p. 66, p. 79: Pl.22)

External links
Welcome To al-Tayyiba
Taybeh, Welcome to Palestine
Survey of Western Palestine, Map 14: IAA, Wikimedia commons
Et Taiyiba Town (Including Badiw al Mu’arrajat Locality) (Fact Sheet), Applied Research Institute–Jerusalem (ARIJ)
Et Taiyiba Town Profile (including Badiw al Mu’arrajat Locality), ARIJ
Aerial photo, ARIJ

Villages in the West Bank
Ramallah and al-Bireh Governorate
Palestinian Christian communities